National Lampoon 1964 High School Yearbook Parody is an American humor book that was first published in 1973. It was a  spin-off from National Lampoon magazine. The book was a parody of a high school yearbook from the early 1960s. It was edited by P. J. O'Rourke and Doug Kenney and art-directed by David Kaestle. Much of the writing was by P. J. O'Rourke and Doug Kenney. The "literary magazine" was written by Sean Kelly; the sports page was by Christopher Cerf; and the Principal's Letter and the "In Memorium" piece were both written by Ed Subitzky.

The book, as it was originally published, appeared to be a genuine 1964 yearbook from "C. Estes Kefauver High School": the Kefauver Kaleidoscope. Senator Kefauver himself had only died the year before, in 1963.  The school is located in "Dacron, Ohio" (a reference to the city Akron, Ohio,  and to inexpensive synthetic fabric Dacron.)

The parody is closely based on the Toledo, Ohio's DeVilbiss High School  yearbook, called the Pot O' Gold. O'Rourke attended DHS for a couple of years and graduated from there in 1965. According to P. J. "We chose 1964 (Doug's graduation class) partly because we published the Parody in 1974 but mostly because that was the last year before the culture and the country came to pieces with sex, drugs, rock and roll, the Vietnam War, the assassination of MLK, etc., etc.… Doug and I… used DeVilbiss because Ohio and Toledo and DHS just seemed so perfectly 1964 American prelapsarian typical… Also, since Doug had gone to an all-boys Catholic prep school (and a pretty fancy one too), his yearbook was no good as a model.” 
 
As portrayed in the Lampoon yearbook, the fictional Kefauver H. S. shares scores of characteristics with DeVilbiss, including the street address and the school colors. Those colors, the rainbow, influenced the names of both the real DeVilbiss yearbook and the fictional Kefauver one. The name of the Kefauver school newspaper, the Prism and its motto are the same as those of DeVilbiss.  The swim team photo caption contains the names of a number of O'Rourke's friends from DeVilbiss. There are also numerous references in the Lampoon to west Toledo landmarks and locations. Like many great parodies, the Lampoon yearbook very closely mimics the style and content of actual yearbooks, only deviating in subtle ways.

The publication also included a copy of the school newspaper, a basketball program, a report card, a diploma, detention slips and a fake ID. According to apparent inscriptions, the book belonged to "Larry Kroger", class of '64. The character Larry Kroger went on to become the college freshman protagonist (played by Tom Hulce) of the comedy movie National Lampoon's Animal House, released in 1978. The character "Mandy Pepperidge" also makes her first appearance in the Yearbook and reappears in the film (played by Mary Louise Weller). 
 
Five years after the Yearbook parody, in 1978, the National Lampoon published the National Lampoon Sunday Newspaper Parody, a fake Sunday newspaper which also claimed to originate in "Dacron, Ohio" but was contemporary, being dated Sunday, February 12, 1978.

The cover photo was taken by Vincent Aiosa.

Note on cover
The credits list the cheerleaders on the cover as models Roberta Caplan, Celia Bau, and Laura Singer. The cover is a one-off gag, unrelated to any of the stories inside.

References

 Info at "Mark's Very Large National Lampoon Site"
 Interview with editor P.J. O'Rourke

1964 High School Yearbook Parody
1973 books
Parody books
Yearbooks
Books about Ohio